Late Night Tales: Belle and Sebastian Vol. II is the 27th release in the Late Night Tales series of DJ mix albums, compiled and mixed by Scottish band Belle & Sebastian. Released on 26 March 2012, it was the group's second Tales compilation, following a 2006 release.

Track listing
 "Ominous Cloud" - Broadcast
 "Watch the Flowers Grow" - The Wonder Who?
 "A Time for Us" - Joe Pass
 "Yekermo Sew (A Man of Experience and Wisdom)" - Mulatu Astatke
 "Tudo Que Você Podia Ser" - Milton Nascimento & Lô Borges
 "Et Si Je T'aime" - Marie Laforêt
 "Bird of Space" - Bonnie Dobson
 "Soul Vibrations" - Dorothy Ashby
 "Tomorrow's People" - McDonald and Giles
 "Quitters Raga" - Gold Panda
 "Chord Simple" - Broadcast
 "Savage Sea" - The Pop Group
 "Starless and Bible Black" - Stan Tracey Quartet
 "Darlin' Be Home Soon" - The Lovin' Spoonful
 "Crash" - Belle & Sebastian
 "L.S.D. Partie" - Roland Vincent
 "Still Sound" - Toro Y Moi
 "Rude Bwoy Thug Life" - Ce'Cile
 "Scottish Widows" - Remember Remember
 "Streets of Derry" - Trees
 "Spinning Wheel" - Blood, Sweat & Tears
 "Homosapien (Dub)" - Pete Shelley
 "Still Thinking of You" - Steve Parks
 "On the Other Ocean" - David Behrman
 "Lost for Words Pt.3" - Paul Morley

References

2012 compilation albums
Belle and Sebastian compilation albums
Belle and Sebastian